The Sound of Sunshine is the seventh studio album by Michael Franti & Spearhead, released by Capitol Records on September 21, 2010.

Background
The inspiration for the title 'The Sound Of Sunshine' came from when Franti was on tour in 2009 and ruptured his appendix. As, in March 2011, he told noted UK soul writer - and Assistant Editor of Blues & Soul -  Pete Lewis: "Because the doctors weren't sure what was wrong with me, seven days actually passed before they were able to diagnose it was my appendix - by which time I'd just completely fallen over and was DYING! So, after they eventually did the surgery on me, while I did feel a huge amount of gratitude to be alive, at the same time every moment of the day I was CRYING! Like someone would walk in the room who I hadn't seen for a while, and I'd just look at them and CRY! And when they'd go 'What are you crying about?', I'd be like 'I don't KNOW! I'm just really glad to be here, to be alive and to SEE you!'... It was like I was seeing everything with new EYES. Every day I'd go to the window to see if the sun was shining - and if it WAS, I'd have this feeling of OPTIMISM! Like 'WOW! I'm gonna beat this infection and I'm gonna get BETTER!'... And so for this album I wanted to put that feeling into words and into MUSIC."

Singles
"Shake It" is the first single from the album. It was released to radio on May 20, 2010.
"The Sound of Sunshine" is the second single released from the album. It was released on June 1, 2010.

Track listing

Critical reception

The Sound of Sunshine received mixed to positive reviews from most music critics. At Metacritic, which assigns a normalized rating out of 100 to reviews from mainstream critics, the album received an average score of 61, based on 7 reviews, which indicates "generally favorable reviews". Allmusic gave the album three and a half stars citing, "The Sound of Sunshine is the “seize the day” result to a reggae-pop, jam band beat, filled with bliss and gratitude plus a bit of swagger and some pointed political moments that remind you this isn't Jack Johnson or John Mayer." Rolling Stone gave the album a mix review.

Rhapsody gave the album a favorable review adding, "Michael Franti is an intriguing artist. His mix of hip-hop beats, reggae and soulful folk-rock has influenced a seemingly endless parade of radio-ready singer-songwriters. And yet Franti himself has always remained on the mainstream's periphery. That's by design -- as The Sound of Sunshine clearly proves." Metromix gave it a mixed review, "The title track, which kicks off the record and then is revisited in a reworked version at the end, is the perfect bookend for this 11-track set that should only expand Franti's growing fan base. [...] While not all of the songs live up to the best three or four, the strength of those tunes makes it easier to forgive the weaker ones." Jon Dolan of Entertainment Weekly gave the album a B+ and said that it "sets evocations of hard-won happiness to similarly strummy, globally grooved hip-hop."

Charts

References

Michael Franti albums
2010 albums
Capitol Records albums